Loscertales is a locality located in the municipality of Loporzano, in Huesca province, Aragon, Spain. As of 2020, it has a population of 7.

Geography 
Loscertales is located 22km east-northeast of Huesca.

References

Populated places in the Province of Huesca